Croatia competed at the 2022 Winter Olympics in Beijing, China, from 4 to 20 February 2022.

The Croatian team consisted of 11 athletes (four men and seven women).

Zrinka Ljutić and Marko Skender were the country's flagbearer during the opening ceremony. Meanwhile, cross-country skier Tena Hadžic was the flagbearer during the closing ceremony.

Competitors
The following is the list of number of competitors participating at the Games per sport/discipline.

Alpine skiing

Croatia qualified three male and two female alpine skiers, then added one more female quota through reallocation.  They also qualified for the team event but declined to participate.

Cross-country skiing

By meeting the basic qualification standards Croatia has qualified one male and one female cross-country skier. An additional female skier is added by virtue of a top 33 placing in the Nations ranking as of December 11, 2021.

Distance

Sprint

Short track speed skating

Croatia has qualified one female short track speed skater. This will mark the country's sport debut at the Winter Olympics.

Valentina Aščić was named to the team on January 18, whilst an additional starting place for the 1500 m event was received through the reallocation process.

Snowboarding

Croatia qualified one athlete for the women's big air and slopestyle competitions, signifying the nation's return to the sport for the first time since Sochi 2014.

Freestyle

References

Nations at the 2022 Winter Olympics
2022
Winter Olympics